Walnut Creek is a stream in the U.S. state of Georgia. It is a tributary to the Middle Oconee River.

Walnut Creek was named for the walnut trees native to the area.

References

Rivers of Georgia (U.S. state)
Rivers of Hall County, Georgia
Rivers of Jackson County, Georgia